GoAgent is a GNU GPL open-source cross-platform network access software. It is mainly written with Python and supports Windows, OS X, Linux and most Linux-based OS like Android and OpenWrt. It uses Google App Engine servers to provide users with a free proxy service to gain access to blocked information. It is normally used with web browsers.

GoAgent was eventually shut down at the request of Chinese law enforcement. A project called XX-Net claims to be "A Reborn GoAgent", with its first release in January 2015.

References

External links
 GoAgent website
 GoAgent on GitHub

Year of introduction missing
Cross-platform free software
Free network-related software
Free web software
Free software programmed in Python
Internet privacy software